Olajide Olayinka Williams "JJ" Olatunji (born 19 June 1993), known professionally as KSI, is an English YouTuber, rapper and boxer. He is a co-founder and member of the British YouTube group known as the Sidemen. He is the CEO of Misfits Boxing and the co-owner of Prime energy drink, XIX Vodka and a restaurant chain known as Sides.

KSI registered his main YouTube account in 2009 and built a following posting gaming commentary videos of the FIFA video game series. His YouTube content later diversified to include vlog and comedy-style videos. As of October 2022, he has over 41 million subscribers and over 10 billion video views across his three YouTube channels.

KSI's 2020 debut studio album, Dissimulation, debuted at number 2 on the UK Albums Chart. His second studio album, All Over the Place, debuted at number 1. He has achieved fourteen top 40 singles on the UK Singles Chart, seven of them ending up in the Top 10 and five of them ending up in the Top 5. KSI featured in the British comedy film Laid in America (2016) and was the subject of KSI: Can't Lose (2018), a documentary film following the build-up to his first amateur boxing fight against British YouTuber Joe Weller, and KSI: In Real Life (2023), an Amazon Prime Video documentary film following his life from June 2021 to October 2022.

He was involved in two further boxing events against American YouTuber Logan Paul, the second of which was a professional bout. On 27 August 2022, he was involved in two exhibition boxing bouts against British rapper Swarmz and Mexican boxer Luis Alcaraz Pineda on the same night, both of which he won by KO. On 14 January 2023, he fought FaZe Temperrr in an exhibition boxing bout, which he won via KO in the first round.

Early life 
Olajide Olayinka Williams Olatunji was born on 19 June 1993 in London and was raised in Watford, Hertfordshire. His father, Jide Adamulla Olatunji, hails from Ibadan, Nigeria. His mother, Yinka Atinuke, is from Islington, London. He was educated at Berkhamsted School in Berkhamsted, where he met future collaborator and Sidemen member Simon Minter. 

KSI's younger brother, Deji Olatunji, is also a YouTuber. The brothers ranked first and second respectively as the "UK's Most Influential YouTube Creators" by Tubular Labs in 2015.

YouTube career

2008–2013: Beginnings, FIFA videos and controversy 

KSI registered his first account on YouTube under the username "JideJunior" in 2008 while in his early teens. He registered his current YouTube account on 24 July 2009 under the name KSIOlajideBT, where he uploaded gaming–commentary videos of the FIFA video game series from his bedroom at his parents' house in Watford. "KSI" stands for Knowledge Strength Integrity. He dropped out of sixth form college to pursue his YouTube career once he was earning steady monthly revenue from his uploads. In an interview in 2014, he recounted asking his teacher whether he should drop-out. His teacher asked how much KSI was making from YouTube, to which KSI answered, "around £1,500 a month", which was more than his teacher earned. His parents initially disapproved, but later became supportive and featured in a number of his videos.

KSI later uploaded more vlog-style content and played a variety of games and in 2012, the channel reached a million subscribers.

KSI's rise to fame was not without controversy. He was widely criticised for his self-described 'rape-face', a recurring joke on his channel during 2012 and 2013, and was the centre of a controversy following third-party allegations of sexual harassment of female staff at a Eurogamer event in 2012, that went so far as accusing him of sexually assaulting a spokesmodel Brandy Brewer, despite her tweeting that she consented to the motorboat, writing, "it's called comedy……relax". As a result, Microsoft cut ties with KSI and he was banned from Eurogamer events. KSI subsequently apologised "for any offence the video of 15 months ago may have caused in the short time it was on his YouTube channel, references to it since and subsequently used by other people" and stated his desire to move on from the incident and "be judged on the great content and value he gives to brands and partners, without controversy."

2013–present: Sidemen and expanding content
In October 2013, KSI signed with Maker Studios' sub-network, Polaris. Since 19 October 2013, KSI has been part of the British YouTube group known as the Sidemen. The group produces online videos, most often consisting of challenges, sketches and video-game commentary, as well as selling exclusive Sidemen merchandise.

Since 2014, KSI's YouTube group the Sidemen have sold and distributed Sidemen Clothing merchandise.

In 2015, KSI published a biography titled KSI: I Am a Bellend. The book was released on 24 September 2015 in the UK and five days later in the United States, and KSI toured to support the book from its release until 4 October 2015.

In 2016, KSI and the Sidemen published Sidemen: The Book, which sold 26,436 copies within three days and topped the hardback nonfiction charts.

On 4 August 2017, KSI tweeted that he would be leaving the Sidemen, citing conflicts with fellow member, Ethan Payne. Shortly thereafter, he released a number of diss track videos criticising members of his then-former group, to which most of the members responded back with their own. Later that month, KSI released a video in which he claimed that he was being deported from the United States for receiving an incorrect visa. In November 2017, KSI released a video discussing whether his supposed falling out with the Sidemen was real or fake, saying, "[the drama] wasn't entirely real but wasn't entirely fake either."

In 2019, he was ranked second by The Sunday Times in its list of the top 100 UK influencers.

In 2020, The Times named KSI to be Britain's biggest influencer.

In 2021, Sidemen launched a subscription service known as Side+. They also launched a restaurant chain known as Sides, and a vodka brand known as XIX Vodka.

Music career

2015–2016: Early releases 
Having written and produced comedy–rap songs for his YouTube channel in 2011, KSI released his debut single, "Lamborghini", featuring British grime MC P Money, on 23 March 2015, with Dcypha Productions. The song charted at number 30 on the UK Singles Chart.

"Keep Up", the title song for KSI's debut extended play of the same name, featuring Jme, was released on 13 November 2015, reaching number 45 on the UK Singles Chart. The full EP was released on 8 January 2016, through Island Records, debuting at number 13 on the UK Albums Chart and number one on the UK R&B Albums Chart.

On 29 April 2016, KSI released "Goes Off", featuring Mista Silva, as the first single from his second EP titled Jump Around. The EP's second single, "Friends with Benefits", featuring MNDM, was released on 29 July 2016, reaching number 69 on the UK Singles Chart. The full EP was released on 28 October 2016 through Island Records. One of the EP's songs, "Touch Down", featuring rapper and singer Stefflon Don, appeared on the soundtrack of the 2017 film Baywatch.

2017–2019: Independent releases 

On 23 June 2017, KSI independently released "Creature", which reached number 100 on the UK Singles Chart. "Creature" was the first single from KSI's third EP, Space, which was released independently on 30 June 2017. On 6 October that year, KSI released his fourth EP, Disstracktions, which includes diss tracks against fellow Sidemen members W2S and Behzinga. The EP reached number 31 on the UK Albums Chart and number one on the UK R&B Albums Chart. One week before its release, KSI announced that the EP would be his "final release" with Island Records and that he would be releasing music independently.

On 2 February 2018, KSI released "Uncontrollable", featuring Big Zuu. The song played during KSI's ring walk for his boxing fight against Joe Weller and charted at number 89 on the UK Singles Chart. KSI released "On Point" on 17 August 2018, which was played during his ring walk for his second boxing bout.

On 12 April 2019, KSI released a collaborative album with Randolph titled New Age. It debuted at number 17 on the UK Albums Chart and at number one on the UK R&B Albums Chart.

2019–2020: New record label signing and Dissimulation 
On 4 November 2019, it was announced that KSI had signed with RBC Records and BMG to "take [his] music to the next level" and "further develop his music career in the US and internationally". In addition to managing KSI's future releases, it was confirmed that the label would be administering and reissuing KSI's independent catalogue recordings. That day, it was confirmed that KSI had already started recording his debut studio album. On 8 November 2019, "Down Like That", featuring Rick Ross, Lil Baby and S-X, was released as the album's lead single. It was performed live by the three featured artists as KSI's entrance music for his boxing rematch against Logan Paul. The song peaked at number 10 on the UK Singles Chart and it has been certified silver by the British Phonographic Industry (BPI) for sales of 200,000 units in the country. On 15 December KSI, Miniminter, TBJZL, and Zerkaa released a Christmas themed single titled "The Gift" under the Sidemen banner featuring S-X which charted at number 77 in the UK. A further three singles preceded the album: "Wake Up Call", featuring Trippie Redd, which debuted at number 11 on the UK Singles Chart; "Poppin", featuring Lil Pump and Smokepurpp, which charted at number 43 in the UK; and "Houdini", featuring Swarmz and Tion Wayne, which debuted at number six on the UK Singles Chart and received a silver certification from the BPI.

KSI's debut studio album, titled Dissimulation, was released on 22 May 2020. The album debuted at number two on the UK Albums Chart and further charted in 15 other countries. It was the UK's best-selling debut album by a British artist in 2020 and it has been certified gold by the BPI for sales of 100,000 units in the country. The album spawned two further UK top 40 singles, "Cap", featuring Offset, and "Killa Killa", featuring Aiyana-Lee. KSI was scheduled to perform at Parklife, Longitude and Reading and Leeds music festivals in 2020 to promote Dissimulation, but these were later cancelled due to the COVID-19 pandemic.

KSI featured on "Lighter" by British DJ and record producer Nathan Dawe. The song peaked at number three on the UK Singles Chart and became one of the UK's best-selling songs of 2020. It has been certified platinum by the BPI for sales of 600,000 units in the UK and it was nominated for Best British Single at the 2021 BRIT Awards. KSI also featured on "Loose" by Zimbabwean-British artist S1mba, which peaked at number 14 on the UK Singles Chart.

2020–2021: All Over the Place and The Online Takeover 

On 23 October 2020, KSI released the first single from his second album, "Really Love" featuring Craig David and Digital Farm Animals, which peaked at number three on the UK Singles Chart and has been certified gold by the BPI. On 15 January 2021, KSI released the album's second single, "Don't Play" with Anne-Marie and Digital Farm Animals. The song debuted at number two on the UK Singles Chart, becoming KSI's highest-charting single in the UK to date, and has been certified platinum by the BPI. On 12 March 2021, KSI released the album's third single, "Patience" featuring Yungblud and Polo G, which debuted at number 3 on the UK Singles Chart and has been certified silver by the BPI.

On 16 February 2021, KSI announced on Twitter the creation of his own record label named "The Online Takeover" in partnership with his music manager Mams Taylor. Shortly after, he announced the first signee of his label, which was American-British singer Aiyana-Lee, who featured on the track "Killa Killa".

On 26 April 2021, KSI announced via his social media the release of his second album All Over the Place, which was released on 16 July 2021. It debuted at number 1 on the UK Album Charts, giving KSI his first-ever chart-topper, and has been certified gold by the BPI for surpassing 100,000 sales in the country.

On 18 June 2021, KSI released the album's fourth single, "Holiday", which was only featured on the platinum edition of the album. The single was originally not planned to be on the album and "You" was set to be the fourth single to be released on 4 June. Due to people leaking songs off the album, including "You", the fourth single was changed to "Holiday". The song debuted at number 2 on the UK Singles Chart, making it KSI's highest-charting solo single to date.

On 6 August 2021, KSI released the album's fifth single, "Lose" with American rapper Lil Wayne, and was the lead single for the deluxe edition of the album, which was released on 27 August. The single peaked at number 18 on the UK Singles Chart and also debuted at number 86 on the Billboard Hot 100, becoming KSI's first ever single to enter that chart.

2022–present: New releases and upcoming album 

On 6 May 2022, KSI featured on "Locked Out" by S-X. The single is S-X's third single for his debut album. "Locked Out" became S-X's first single to chart in the UK Official Charts which peaked at number 53.

On 13 May, KSI announced that he and Proper Loud have signed Yxng Dave to The Online Takeover, marking him the second artist to be signed to the label.

On 30 May, it was announced that KSI had signed with Atlantic Records and Warner Music UK "following his huge collaboration with Anne-Marie on Don't Play". On 5 August, KSI released "Not Over Yet" featuring Tom Grennan. "Not Over Yet" charted at number four on the UK Single Charts, and debuted at number one on The Official Big Top 40. The single marked the first record under Atlantic Records. A remix featuring Headie One and Nines released on 28 August and served as KSI's ring walk tune in his bout against Luis Alcaraz Pineda on 27 August. On 30 September, KSI released "Summer Is Over." On 5 December, KSI, TBJZL and Vikkstar123 released a Christmas themed single titled "Christmas Drillings" under the Sidemen banner featuring Jme. On 27 January, KSI released "Voices" featuring Oliver Tree.

Boxing career

Amateur career

KSI vs Weller 
Supposed hostilities between KSI and British YouTuber Joe Weller began towards the end of 2017. Following public disagreements on Twitter and diss-tracks between the pair, they announced that they would host an amateur boxing match on 3 February 2018 at Copper Box Arena, London, to settle the feud. During the announcement, the pair confronted each other, with KSI mocking Weller's struggles with depression and his use of antidepressants for which he later apologised.

The fight was won by KSI 1 minute and 37 seconds into the third round by way of technical knockout. KSI expressed his respect for Weller after the fight for being "way harder, way tougher than I thought," and praised him for his commitment to raising awareness for mental health, before calling out American YouTuber Logan Paul, his brother Jake Paul, and retired footballer Rio Ferdinand.

KSI vs Paul 

On 24 February 2018, it was announced that KSI would be fighting Logan Paul in a white-collar boxing amateur boxing match. The fight ended as a majority draw, with two judges scoring the fight even at 57–57 and a third judge scoring 58–57 in favour of KSI.

Professional career and exhibition bouts

KSI vs. Paul II 

A rematch between KSI and Paul was held on 9 November 2019 at the Staples Center, Los Angeles, and was promoted by Eddie Hearn. Unlike the first fight, the rematch was a professional fight without the use of headgear. KSI was trained by professional boxers Viddal Riley and Jeff Mayweather, uncle of Floyd Mayweather Jr. KSI defeated Paul via split decision, with two judges scoring the bout 56–55 and 57–54 in favour of KSI, and a third judge scoring the fight 56–55 in favour of Paul.

KSI vs Swarmz & Alcaraz Pineda 

On 22 June 2021, KSI announced that he and Wasserman Promotions had partnered up to launch a boxing promotional company titled "Misfits Boxing". The first event was scheduled to take place on 27 August 2022 with KSI also set to make his boxing return as the main event.

On 1 July 2022, it was announced that KSI vs Alex Wassabi was scheduled to take place on 27 August 2022; however, due to a major concussion, it was announced on 6 August that Swarmz would be Wassabi's replacement. This marked the first event under KSI's promotion company Misfits Boxing. A series of other boxing events titled "MF & DAZN: X Series" in collaboration with DAZN, who were the distributors for KSI's previous rematch against Logan Paul, was announced, along with events to follow, marking the KSI vs Swarmz event X Series 001. 

On 16 August, it was announced that KSI will be facing a second opponent, thus billing the event "2 Fights 1 Night." His initial second fight was scheduled to be against the Bulgarian boxer Ivan Nikolov, who was pulled from the fight due to Nikolov having multiple white supremacist and Neo-Nazi tattoos. On 20 August, the Mexican professional boxer Luis Alcaraz Pineda was announced as KSI's second opponent on 27 August. KSI defeated Swarmz via 2nd round KO and won the ICB World cruiserweight title and the MF cruiserweight title. KSI then defeated Alcaraz Pineda via 3rd round KO and retained his MF cruiserweight title.

KSI vs Temperrr 

On 19 November, it was announced that KSI would face Dillon Danis on 14 January 2023 at Wembley Arena, London, England. However, on 4 January, Danis withdrew due to lack of preparation, lack of a coach, and issues with the contracted weight. It was announced that KSI would defend his MF cruiserweight title agaisnt Brazilian YouTuber and FaZe Clan founder FaZe Temperrr, replacing Danis within a weeks notice. KSI defeated Temperrr via 1st round KO and retained his MF cruiserweight title.

Other ventures

Acting

In 2016 KSI and Caspar Lee starred in the British direct-to-video comedy film Laid in America. The film was written and directed by Sam Milman and Peter Vass, and was produced by The Fun Group LLC and Max Gottlieb. The film was released direct-to-video by Universal Pictures on 26 September 2016. Jason Best of Movie Talk gave the film 1 out of 5 and called it "Crass and witless."

In 2018 KSI released a documentary film titled KSI: Can't Lose. The film reveals the behind the scenes of what led KSI to become the YouTube champion of the world after his boxing debut fight against fellow YouTube star Joe Weller, and how KSI will use what he learned to fight Logan Paul. The film was produced by fellow YouTuber Callux's film studio After Party Studios and was distributed by Sony Pictures Home Entertainment.

KSI makes a brief appearance in the Amazon Original sports docuseries All or Nothing: Arsenal, which documented the club by spending time with the coaching staff and players behind the scenes both on and off the field throughout their 2021–22 season.

In 2022, it was announced that a documentary called KSI: In Real Life would be produced by Amazon Prime Video and Louis Theroux, focusing on KSI's life and career. Theroux stated that it would be "an opportunity to see another side of JJ, understanding how he got where he is, the world of a premium online content creator today, and a man who has made it his brand never to lose, as he takes on the music business."

Video games
In 2016 KSI teamed up with Endemol Shine Group to publish KSI Unleashed, a video game that launched on iOS and Android systems. KSI poked jabs at fellow YouTuber PewDiePie claiming that "why would I make anyone have to spend money to buy my mobile app game." referring to the fact that PewDiePie: Legend of the Brofist was not a free application. KSI Unleashed was removed from the Google Play Store and App Store on an unknown date.

In 2018 KSI's YouTube group the Sidemen teamed up with True Georgie and Viker Limited to release BoxTuber, a video game that launched on iOS and Android systems. The game was made to promote the KSI vs. Logan Paul boxing match by featuring different YouTubers that the player can fight. After 24 hours after the game's released, BoxTuber climbed to the top of the UK iTunes charts. BoxTuber was removed from the Google Play Store and App Store on an unknown date.

In 2018, KSI took part in the promotional efforts for EA Sports UFC 3 by training alongside former UFC middleweight world champion Michael Bisping.

Prime

In 2022, KSI announced that he and Logan Paul had founded a drinks company known as Prime.

On February 21, 2023, KSI announced his own limited time Prime flavor called Orange and Mango.

Personal life
KSI is a supporter of Arsenal F.C. In his "Googling Myself" video, KSI revealed that he is agnostic.

Income and wealth 
Forbes reported that KSI was contracted to earn a minimum amount of $900,000 from his second fight against Logan Paul in 2019.

In 2015, KSI's earnings were estimated by Forbes as being over $4.5 million, ranking him as the fifth-highest-paid YouTuber in the world at the time.

In 2018, Esquire magazine reported that, according to Social Blade, KSI can make up to £250,000 in advertising revenue from one video and that product endorsements on his social media cost around £75,000. Heavy reported in the same year that KSI was the director of three UK companies with equity totalling £1.7 million ($2.2 million).

Business Insider reported that KSI's amateur boxing match versus Logan Paul in 2018 generated around £8.5 million ($11 million) from pay-per-view revenue alone and a further live gate revenue of over £2.7 million from ticket sales. Some estimates calculated the potential earnings from the fight at £30million to £40million each, but KSI dismissed these claims, stating that his earnings were "a high amount", but "nowhere near £40million or £20million".

In an interview with Men's Health, KSI confirmed that he also owns over ten properties "all around England" with a combined worth of over £10 million.

In 2020, The Sunday Times estimated KSI's earnings to be £12 million a year; a year later, they believed that his estimated earnings had gone up by another £13 million.

He has been open about his investments in cryptocurrency, but he has reportedly lost almost £6 million. Since the losses, he has claimed to be done with crypto.

Philanthropy 
In 2015, KSI donated $10,000 to an online charity stream done by YouTuber Castro1021, and he participated in the Race Against Slime event, raising money for SpecialEffect, a foundation developing technology to aid people with physical disabilities to play video games. Between 2016 and 2022, KSI and the rest of the Sidemen hosted and participated in four charity football events, raising just shy of £400,000 for various charities, including the Saint's Foundation, Childline, Young Minds and the Charlton Athletic Community Trust. On 8 May 2020, KSI helped out at a food bank to support The Independent's Help the Hungry campaign. On 18 December 2020, KSI prepared meals to support the Evening Standard's Food for London Now campaign. KSI donated £10,000 to BBC Radio 1's "Lol-a-thon" fundraiser for Comic Relief on 11 March 2021. On 30 March 2021, it was announced that KSI had signed an open letter, written by Lenny Henry, to urge Black British people to take the COVID-19 vaccine.

Boxing record

Professional

Exhibition

Amateur

Pay-per-view bouts

Filmography

Gameography

Discography

Studio albums
 Dissimulation (2020)
 All Over the Place (2021)

Collaborative albums
 New Age with Randolph (2019)

Concert tours 
 Jump Around Tour (2016)
 The New Age Tour (2019)
 All Over The Place Tour (2021–2022)

Bibliography

Awards and nominations

Notes

References

External links

 
1993 births
Living people
Black British male rappers
British trap musicians
Comedy YouTubers
Cruiserweight boxers
English-language YouTube channels
English agnostics
English entertainers
English male boxers
English male film actors
English male rappers
English male writers
English people of Nigerian descent
English people of Yoruba descent
English pop musicians
English YouTubers
Gaming YouTubers
Grime music artists
Internet memes
Musicians from Watford
Music YouTubers
People educated at Berkhamsted School
Pop rappers
RPM people
YouTube boxers
UK garage musicians
YouTube controversies
YouTubers from London